The 1992 presidential campaign of George H. W. Bush was an unsuccessful re-election campaign for 1992 United States presidential election by incumbent president George H. W. Bush, who had taken office on January 20, 1989. Bush and incumbent vice president Dan Quayle were defeated by Democratic presidential nominee Bill Clinton and vice presidential nominee Al Gore. Bush, a Republican president and former vice president under Ronald Reagan, launched his presidential bid on October 11, 1991 and secured nomination for his re-election on August 20, 1992. He was challenged in the Republican primaries by former White House Communications Director Pat Buchanan, who received less than one percent of the delegates in the Convention.

With a coalition victory in the Persian Gulf War and high approval ratings, Bush's re-election initially looked likely; however, he was criticized by many conservatives for breaking his pledge of never raising taxes. He felt the economy would be the deciding factor in the election and could even overshadow the success of Operation Desert Storm. Early counting of ballots in the New Hampshire primary favored Buchanan, but the final results gave a victory to Bush. It was a strong showing by Buchanan, as his score nearly matched Eugene McCarthy's protest vote against Lyndon B. Johnson in 1968. During the Republican National Convention, it was speculated that Bush might drop Quayle from the ticket due to his relatively low polling performance, but Bush was unwilling, asserting that removing his 1988 choice from the 1992 ticket would be an implicit admission that choosing Quayle had been a mistake.

Meanwhile, Democrats nominated Bill Clinton, the governor of Arkansas as their presidential nominee, with Al Gore, a senator from Tennessee, as his running mate. Texas billionaire Ross Perot ran as an independent candidate; at one point Perot had a clear lead over the major-party candidates in the polls. During the campaign, Bush emphasized his foreign policy success, but as the economy went into a recession, his popularity fell. He conducted a whistle stop tour on a train named Spirit of America and participated in a series of three presidential debates. Clinton won the election, taking 43 percent of the popular vote and 370 electoral votes, while Bush won 37.5 percent of the popular vote and 168 electoral votes. Perot won 19% of the popular vote, one of the highest totals for a third-party candidate in U.S. history, but no electoral votes. Bush left office with a 56% approval rating and 37% disapproval rating.

Background 

Bush was born in Milton, Massachusetts, in 1924. In 1964, he ran for the United States Senate from Texas and won the Republican nomination, but lost the election by 56% to 44%. He was elected to the U.S. House of Representatives from Texas's 7th congressional district in 1966. He served as ambassador to the United Nations under the Nixon Administration—his first major diplomatic experience with the Soviet Union and China. He ran in the 1980 Republican Party presidential primaries against Ronald Reagan, Bob Dole, and many other candidates. He won a close victory in the Iowa caucus with 31.5% to Reagan's 29.4%, but ended up losing many contests to Reagan, and dropped out of the race. Reagan chose Bush to run as the Republican nominee for vice president. Bush accepted the position and threw himself into campaigning for the Reagan-Bush ticket. They won the 1980 presidential election in a landslide victory against the incumbent President Jimmy Carter. As vice president, Bush maintained a low profile by avoiding decision-making and not criticizing the president publicly. Reagan won his re-election in 1984 in a landslide victory against Walter Mondale, winning 49 of 50 states with Bush re-elected as vice president.

In 1987, Bush announced his presidential campaign led by Reagan staffer Lee Atwater. Bob Dole, Jack Kemp, and Pat Robertson challenged him in the primaries. After he won South Carolina, and 16 of 17 states on Super Tuesday, his competitors dropped out of the race. Bush also pledged that he would not raise taxes, stating: "read my lips: no new taxes". Bush selected Senator Dan Quayle of Indiana as his running mate. They won the 1988 presidential election against Democratic nominee Michael Dukakis, and Bush became the first incumbent vice president to be elected president since Martin Van Buren in 1836. Bush was inaugurated on January 20, 1989, with an approval rating of 51%.

During his term, Bush signed various bilateral treaties between the United States and the Soviet Union, like START I and START II, on the limitation of strategic offensive arms and nuclear weapons.  With the fall of Berlin Wall in late 1989, the Bush administration facilitated reunification of Germany on terms favorable to the United States and a democratic Germany. During the same time, the United States invaded Panama to depose Panamanian dictator Manuel Noriega. With Soviet regime's position weakening on all fronts, the Soviet Union dissolved in late 1991, thus ending the Cold War. Bush achieved an approval rating of 89% in March 1991, after the United States' and coalition victory in Persian Gulf.

However, as the economy went into a recession in 1990, the unemployment rate rose from 5.9% in 1989 to a high of 7.8%  in mid-1991 and the debt percentage of total gross domestic product (GDP) rose from 39.4% in 1989 to almost 46.8% in 1992. As the recession continued, people became increasingly worried about the changing economic situation of the nation. In September 1990, Bush and congressional Democrats announced a compromise to cut funding for mandatory and discretionary programs while also raising revenue, partly through a higher gas tax. The compromise included a "pay as you go" provision that required that new programs be paid for at the time of implementation. Conservatives opposed the bill, strongly against any form of tax increase. Bush's decision to sign the bill damaged his standing with conservatives and the public as he broke his pledge to never to raise taxes.

Gaining the nomination

Preparing for a run 
In early 1991, Bush once considered not running for re-election, asserting he seemed not to have an "ounce of energy to manage a massive project". With the end of the Persian Gulf war in March 1991, Bush had very high approval ratings, some even approaching 90%. But by 1992, many conservative Republicans' support of Bush had waned for a variety of reasons, including raising taxes and cutting defense spending. Americans were less concerned with his foreign policy successes than the nation's changing economic situation. Bush was not impressed by the polls' prediction that he would win re-election. He felt the economy would be the deciding factor in the election and could even overshadow the success of Operation Desert Storm. While 71% of the population viewed Bush's handling of foreign policy positively, only 21% approved of his handling of domestic issues. Yet, while addressing a rally in Texas on February 12, 1992, he announced his re-election bid and said:

After the success of the Gulf War, Bush's re-election was considered highly likely. Several high-profile Democratic Party candidates, like Mario Cuomo and Jesse Jackson, refused to seek the Democratic nomination. The media gave the Democratic Party little chance of winning the presidency. Most Republicans continued to endorse Bush as their nominee. Ron Paul, the Libertarian Party's presidential nominee in 1988, had planned to run against the president as a Republican, but dropped out shortly after former White House communication director Pat Buchanan's entry in the Republican primaries. In 1990, determined to undercut Bush, Buchanan published a newsletter called Patrick J. Buchanan: From the Right; it sent subscribers a bumper sticker reading: "Read Our Lips! No new taxes".

Vice-presidential selection 

Throughout Bush's presidency, there existed widespread speculation about Bush potentially replacing Quayle as his running-mate in his expected 1992 reelection.  As early as 1989, Quayle's poor public standing was noted by the Washington Post, which conducted a poll that found voters did not consider him fit to take over the presidency by a 52 to 38 percent margin. In 1990, The New York Times reported that there was a movement to have Quayle replaced on the Republican ticket in 1992. The choice of running mate was considered to be particularly important given Bush's age and widely-reported health issues.

Despite Bush's misgivings with the Vice President, he was reluctant to drop Quayle in the absence of him voluntarily stepping aside. Bush asserted that removing his 1988 choice from the 1992 ticket would be an implicit admission that choosing Quayle had been a mistake. In the aftermath of criticism over raising taxes, Bush had no appetite for another controversial political moment. Nevertheless, there were reports that Bush did indeed consult with top confidantes about replacing Quayle on at least two occasions, including in a conversation with Chief of Staff James Baker.

The May 1992 issue of Time magazine features a cover story on the push to replace Quayle on the ticket. The names mentioned were:

 Dick Cheney, Secretary of Defense
 Colin Powell, Chairman of the Joint Chiefs of Staff
 Pete Wilson, Governor of California
 Nancy Kassebaum, Senator from Kansas
 Carroll Campbell, Governor of South Carolina

Bush's son George W. Bush urged his him to replace Quayle with Cheney, and his son Jeb Bush also urged him to replace Quayle because of his relatively low polling performance. Former Presidents Gerald Ford and Richard Nixon also urged Quayle's removal from the Republican ticket.

Republican presidential primaries 

Primaries were held for all 50 states and the District of Columbia from February 18 to June 9, 1992. In addition to Buchanan; David Duke, Pat Paulsen, Harold Stassen and Jack Fellure had also challenged Bush. Buchanan's candidacy relied heavily on a strong showing in the New Hampshire primary, as a result, Bush made New Hampshire a focal point in his re-election bid. However, New Hampshire remained a pivotal base for Buchanan's primary campaign. Buchanan explained the reason for running against incumbent President Bush:

Buchanan ran on a platform of immigration reduction and social conservatism, including opposition to multiculturalism, abortion, and gay rights. Even after challenging an incumbent president in the primaries, his campaign managed to raise $14,521,899 from donations. Early counting of ballots in the New Hampshire primary favored Buchanan, but the final results gave a victory to Bush with 53% of the votes, followed by Buchanan with 38% of the vote. It was a strong showing by Buchanan as Bush got fewer votes than expected. Buchanan's score nearly matched Eugene McCarthy's protest vote against Lyndon B. Johnson in 1968.

Heading into primaries in Georgia and Texas, the campaign pollster Robert Teeter argued that Bush should criticize Buchanan's campaign directly, while Quayle disagreed. Bush said he would largely not criticize Buchanan directly, but "might tweak him from time to time". On the evening of the Georgia primary, in an interview to The Atlanta Constitution, Bush accepted that the tax increases in the 1990 budget deal had been his "biggest mistake". Buchanan managed to get 35% or more votes in primaries until March 10, after which, Bush won all the primaries on Super Tuesday which gave his campaign a lead in the polls. During a speech in May 1992 at the Commonwealth Club in San Francisco, Quayle discussed the high costs of the breakdown of the two-parent family and mentioned the sitcom television series Murphy Brown. He asserted that its plot-line was injurious to family values. He found the plot-line where a woman bore a child out of wedlock mocked the importance of fathers. Murphy Browns co-creator Diane English responded, "If the vice president thinks it's disgraceful for an unmarried woman to bear children (out of wedlock), and if he believes that a woman cannot adequately raise a child without a father, then he'd better make sure abortion remains safe and legal." Quayle's comments backfired and were widely attacked for seeming to be insensitive to single mothers, but Quayle's criticism didn't affect the primary result and Bush went on to win all the remaining contests.

Bush won 72.84% of the popular vote while Buchanan won 22.96%. The fact that Buchanan got almost 2.9 million votes despite challenging an incumbent in primaries threatened Bush's campaign for his presidential run.

Republican National Convention 

In early August, the Bush campaign and the administration debated how Bush might take the initiative on the domestic front. The early ideas for the president's acceptance speech were issues that would have broad appeal. The 1992 Republican National Convention convened at the Astrodome in Houston, Texas, from August 17–20, 1992. To accommodate the convention and its set-up, the Houston Astros, the Major League Baseball team that played at the Astrodome, played 26 consecutive away games over 28 days, while the National Football League's Houston Oilers played all their preseason games on the road. After the primaries, Buchanan endorsed Bush as the Republican nominee and was asked by the Bush campaign to deliver a keynote address at RNC, where his culture war speech alienated many moderates. With all the state contests settled in Bush's favor, the roll of delegates drawn up by the RNC heavily favored Bush as the unanimous choice, though Buchanan and Alan Keyes also won delegates.

Heading to the convention, Robert Teeter said that the south was critical for Bush's re-election strategy, since both Bill Clinton and Al Gore were southerners. The 1992 convention was where former president Ronald Reagan made the last major address of his political career. Before the convention, Bill Clinton's poll numbers were rising, sharply affected by the fact he delivered his acceptance speech on the same night when Ross Perot dropped out of the race. Reagan said:The convention energized the Republican base, giving the Bush-Quayle ticket a bounce in the polls. As the bounce faded, the race returned to a lopsided double-digit lead of the Democratic ticket. During his acceptance speech, President Bush thanked former president Richard Nixon for his advice and contributions to the administration's foreign policy. Bush opened his acceptance speech with issues related to foreign policy, taking credit for the multiple changes that had convulsed the world since the previous RNC convention four years before. He said:

Bush received 2166 delegates; Buchanan received 18 delegates; and Alan Keyes received one delegate. Quayle was nominated as the vice-presidential candidate by voice vote.

Opponents 

The major candidates for Democratic nomination were Bill Clinton, Jerry Brown, and Paul Tsongas. Clinton was accused by Republicans and the Bush campaign of misleading the U.S. Army Reserve to avoid service in the Vietnam War. Though Brown was leading in the polls in September 1991, Clinton's lead eventually increased in February 1992, and he became the front runner. After coming in second place in New Hampshire, he delivered a speech labeling himself "The Comeback Kid", which re-energized his campaign. Clinton chose Al Gore, a senator from Tennessee as his running mate. Clinton appeared on The Arsenio Hall Show on June 3, 1992, the day after he secured the Democratic Party nomination, and played "Heartbreak Hotel" on the saxophone. This was considered an important moment in the campaign, as it helped him build popularity among young voters.

Texas businessman Ross Perot stated on Larry King Live on February 20, 1992, that he would begin a campaign if "ordinary people" signed petitions and helped him achieve ballot access in all 50 states. Following this, Tom Luce, a friend of Perot, organized draft movement throughout the nation with petition drives being coordinated. He chose retired Vice Admiral James Stockdale as his running mate. Throughout April, the draft efforts continued and Perot appeared on talk shows for discussing his plans and positions on political issues. He spend almost $61 million of his own money to finance the campaign. In June 1992, he was leading Bush and Clinton nationally with 39% of the vote. Speculation arose in the media that Perot would split the electoral college and force the United States House of Representatives to decide the presidency.

On July 16, Perot announced on Larry King Live he would not seek the presidency. He explained that he did not want the House of Representatives to decide the election if the result caused the electoral college to be split. He had also been deterred because of rumors that Bush campaign was planning on embarrassing his daughter by publicly releasing her doctored photographs and disrupting her wedding. In August, he promised to endorse any candidate who accepted his economic plan; meanwhile, petitions for ballot access were approved in all 50 states. On October 1, Perot re-entered the presidential race, with a desire to further explain his economic plans.

Campaign

August 
On August 23, while addressing a rally at Lakeland, Florida, Quayle claimed that Bush planned to reduce taxes and spending to create new jobs. Quayle proposed an entitlement program which included medicare, medicaid and guaranteed loans. Bush campaigned extensively for the election. Just a week after the convention, he addressed a rally in Cincinnati, Ohio, where he criticized Clinton's health care plan and said it would lead to a new health care tax on those who can least afford it. He argued that even with Clinton as governor of Arkansas for 12 years, one in four lacked health insurance. He said the real price of the Clinton program was arguably at least three times higher than admitted, and referred to it as an "economic fantasy".

The Bush campaign denounced Clinton for avoiding military service in Vietnam. During speeches, Bush focused on his idea of letting parents, not government, choose their children's schools, whether public, private or religious. He raised issues about equivocation in statements made by Governor Clinton. According to the Center for Media and Public Affairs, 96% of evening news coverage throughout August focused on economic weakness and shortcomings. Political scientist Everett Carll Ladd later wrote "that the negative coverage distorted a complex picture with many positive as well as negative features", leading to reduce in Bush's polling numbers.

September 

In early September, the feud between Quayle and Murphy Brown again gathered attention as the vice president responded to Diane English's comments. While addressing a rally in Columbus, Mississippi, Quayle denied that he ever attacked single parents or said that single parent families doesn't meet Republican value tests. He blamed Hollywood for misleading people regarding his views. Soon after Quayle's comments, Republicans were trailing to Democrats among single parents in polls.

Initially, the general opinion polls showed the president leading with almost 45% to Clinton's 25%, and Perot's 24%, but his lead soon reduced in May, when Perot started leading the polls. As Perot's polling numbers increased, Bush wrote in his diary that Perot is "outrageously ill-suited to be president of the United States". When Perot dropped out of the race, Clinton gained a huge bounce in his polling numbers, as a result Bush's poll numbers dropped from 57% to 32%. In late August, even after RNC, Bush's polling numbers managed to reach only 36% to Clinton's 53%, which Bush called "discouraging as hell". Upon Perot's re-entrance in the race, Clinton was leading over both Bush and Perot.In late September, during a rally in Springfield, Missouri, Bush said:
Bush strongly emphasized his foreign policy success like the Gulf War and the United States invasion of Panama. By the end of September 1992, he had addressed many rallies along with Quayle, criticizing Clinton's campaign either for his economic plan or for his views on foreign affairs or national security. On September 26, Bush conducted a whistle stop train tour on a train named The Spirit of America starting in Columbus, Ohio, and covering various cities on its route, including Marysville, Arlington, Bowling Green, and Plymouth. The next day, he continued his campaign by train, visiting Wixom and Grand Blanc in Michigan.

October 

Bush supported cutting domestic spending, taxes, and proposed to change budget accounting. He stressed his Clean Air Act, and blamed the Democratic-controlled congress for ignoring his plan of cutting dependency on foreign oil. He opposed national health insurances and wanted to preserve the public-private health care system through comprehensive reforms. He often called Clinton health care plan as "payroll tax for government take-over of healthcare". Emphasizing on his welfare reform, he promised to "strike a new course" to build moral and family values of people on welfare. He supported new welfare approaches by states through exemption from federal laws. He continued Reagan's supply-side economics, but while campaigning, claimed that his government's platform supports increased access to capital for business expansion, exporting long term investment and capital to bring new products to the market. The Bush campaign promised across-the-board tax cuts and supported enterprise zones in cities.

The Bush campaign advertised extensively, spending $38.5 million on paid advertisements on television and radio. Several of the Bush campaign's commercials were based on a single theme that Clinton would impose taxes on energy, that he dubbed a "carbon tax" that would eventually drive up utility bills and cost jobs. The ads attacked Clinton over his tax increase as governor of Arkansas, criticized his health care plan and his inconsistency on major issues like term limits and defense. Bush's campaign focused on the notion that America must be a "military superpower, an economic superpower, and an export superpower". With Robert Mosbacher as the fundraiser, Bush campaign and managed to raise $101,936,902 through fundraising. Clinton's advisor, James Carville, coined a phrase "It's the economy, stupid", which was often used to attack Bush campaign. Bush's oldest son George W. Bush was involved in the campaign as a campaign advisor to the president, one of the seven people the president appointed to manage his campaign. As an advisor, he warned the Bush campaign that Perot should be taken seriously as a possible presidential candidate. On October 6, a month before election day, Bush signed an appropriation that would provide $5 million to a prospective transition. If Clinton were to win, the appropriation would give his transition team $3.5 million, and give $1.5 million to Bush's administration to aid them in the transition.

Bush took part in a series of three presidential debates between himself, Clinton, and Perot. Perot was eligible for participating in debates, as he had re-entered the race in early October. Quayle participated in the vice-presidential debate between himself, Gore, and Stockdale. Bush was criticized for his performance in debates. In the polls conducted by CNN/USA Today after each debate, 20% of people said that he won the debates on average, while 39% went with Clinton, 30% went with Perot and 11% were undecided. During a debate, Bush said that he strongly supported term limits for members of the US Congress, limiting their term to 24 years, which Clinton opposed. Bush was seen on national camera checking his watch while being asked about the effect of the national debt on him personally.

Election day 

A few days before election day, Gallup polls showed Bush 12% behind Clinton. On November 3, 1992, Bush lost the election to Clinton, coming in second place. He got 168 electoral votes and 37.55% of the popular vote. Clinton won 370 electoral votes and 43% of the popular vote, while Ross Perot finished third, winning no electoral votes but receiving 18.9% of the popular vote. President Bush's 37.5% was the lowest percentage for a sitting president seeking re-election since William Howard Taft, in 1912 (23.2%), as the 1912 election was a three-way race (that time between Taft, Wilson, and Theodore Roosevelt). It was also the lowest percentage for a major party candidate since Alf Landon received 36.5% of the vote in 1936. Bush had a lower percentage of the popular vote than Herbert Hoover, who was defeated in 1932 (39.7%). Bush did not get a majority of the votes in any state. His strongest performance was in Nebraska's 3rd congressional district, where he had 49.7% of votes. The same night, he conceded to Clinton and said:

 It was popularly believed that Perot was spoiler and cost Bush his re-election. White House Chief of Staff and one of Bush's re-election campaign manager James Baker pointed out that "Perot took two out of every three votes from traditional Republican voters." But, in a 1999 study conducted by the American Journal of Political Science, it was estimated that Perot's candidacy did not hurt Bush's campaign, but ended up splitting Clinton's votes, reducing his margin of victory over Bush by seven percentage points. By that measure, if Perot had not been in the race, Clinton would have won by an even greater majority. When Perot was asked about being a spoiler in the election, he replied, "There is no way I can be a spoiler, it was already spoiled when I started". The outcome of the 1992 U.S. presidential election has been explained largely as a function of voters' perceptions of Bush's economic performance. The economy submerged questions about Bill Clinton's character, awarding the advantage to the Democrat.

Results

Aftermath 

Following his defeat in the election, Bush publicly proclaimed his desire for a smooth transition between his and the incoming administration. Bush is often praised for his efforts and co-operation in the transition. His broken promise of never raising taxes is often considered one of several important factors leading to his defeat. A few hours before Clinton's inauguration, Bush left him a handwritten letter in the Oval Office which ended as "Your success is now our county's success. I am rooting hard for you". Clinton appreciated the letter, and later said, "No words of mine or others can better reveal the heart of who he was than those he wrote himself." Clinton was inaugurated on January 20, 1993 as 42nd president of the United States, with Bush attending the inauguration. Bush left office with a 56% approval rating and a 37% disapproval rating.

Shortly after leaving office, in 1994, Bush's oldest son George W. Bush was elected the governor of Texas. He was re-elected governor in 1998, with his younger brother Jeb Bush being elected governor of Florida. In a 1999 interview with Jim Lehrer, on being asked what he was thinking as he checked his wristwatch, he replied:

The same year, Quayle announced a run for president, challenging the Republican front-runner George W. Bush. Quayle attacked Bush saying, "we do not want another candidate who needs on-the-job training". George W. Bush eventually won the Republican nomination and became the 43rd president narrowly defeating Vice President Gore; he remained president until 2009. During his presidency, he led efforts to have his father and Clinton work together to provide help and private aid to those affected by the 2004 Indian Ocean earthquake and tsunami. In a 2012 book, The Presidents Club by Nancy Gibbs and Michael Duffy, they wrote, "Bush [George H. W. Bush] would go so far as to suggest more than once that he might be the father that Clinton had always lacked—a notion that the younger man did not dispute."

See also
 
 Supermarket scanner moment

Notes

References

Further reading 

 
 
 

George H. W. Bush
Dan Quayle
Bush, George H. W.
Bush, George H. W.
Presidency of George H. W. Bush
Political history of the United States